Latin Shadows is an album by American jazz organist Shirley Scott recorded in 1965 for the Impulse! label.

Reception
The Allmusic review awarded the album 3 stars.

Track listing
 "Latin Shadows" (Gary McFarland) - 3:13
 "Downtown" (Tony Hatch) - 3:19
 "Who Can I Turn To (When Nobody Needs Me)" (Leslie Bricusse, Anthony Newley) - 2:38
 "Can't Get Over the Bossa Nova" (Eydie Gorme, Steve Lawrence) - 2:43
 "This Love of Mine" (Sol Parker, Hank Sanicola, Frank Sinatra) - 3:23
 "Perhaps, Perhaps, Perhaps (Quizás, Quizás, Quizás)" (Osvaldo Farrés) - 2:38
 "Soul Sauce" (Dizzy Gillespie, Chano Pozo) - 2:50
 "Hanky Panky" (McFarland) - 4:17
 "Noche Azúl" (Shirley Scott) - 2:47
 "Dreamsville" (Ray Evans, Jay Livingston, Henry Mancini) - 3:15
 "Feeling Good" (Bricusse, Newley) - 3:36
Recorded in New York City on July 21, 1965 (tracks 2, 4, 5 & 8-10) and July 21, 1965 (tracks 1, 3, 6, 7 & 11), 1964

Personnel
Shirley Scott — organ, vocals
Gary McFarland - vibes, arranger, conductor
Jerome Richardson - flute (tracks 1, 3, 6, 7 & 11)
Harry Cykman, Arnold Eidus, Leo Kruczek, Charles Libove, Aaron Rosand - violin (tracks 1, 3, 6, 7 & 11)
Charles McCracken, Edgardo Sodero, Joseph Tekula - cello (tracks 1, 3, 6, 7 & 11)
Jimmy Raney - guitar
Bob Cranshaw (tracks 2, 4, 5 & 8-10), Richard Davis (tracks 1, 3, 6, 7 & 11) - bass
Mel Lewis - drums
Willie Rodriguez - percussion

References

Impulse! Records albums
Shirley Scott albums
1965 albums
Albums produced by Bob Thiele
Albums arranged by Gary McFarland
Albums conducted by Gary McFarland